Leptothyrella is a genus of brachiopods belonging to the family Platidiidae.

The species of this genus are found in the coasts of Africa.

Species:

Leptothyrella fijiensis 
Leptothyrella galatheae 
Leptothyrella ignota 
Leptothyrella incerta

References

Brachiopod genera